The Switzerland men's national under-18 ice hockey team is the men's national under-18 ice hockey team of Switzerland. The team is controlled by the Swiss Ice Hockey Association, a member of the International Ice Hockey Federation. The team represents Switzerland at the IIHF World U18 Championships.

International competitions

IIHF World U18 Championships

1999: 4th place
2000: 4th place
2001:  2nd place
2002: 7th place
2003: 9th place
2004: 1st in Division I Group A
2005: 9th place
2006: 1st in Division I Group A
2007: 6th place
2008: 8th place
2009: 8th place

2010: 5th place
2011: 7th place
2012: 7th place
2013: 6th place
2014: 7th place
2015: 4th place
2016: 8th place
2017: 8th place
2018: 9th place
2019: 9th place
2020: Cancelled due to the COVID-19 pandemic
2021: 8th place

External links
 Team Switzerland all time scoring leaders in IIHF U18 World Championships
Switzerland at IIHF.com

I
National under-18 ice hockey teams